She Shall Have Music is a 1935 British musical comedy film directed by Leslie S. Hiscott and starring Jack Hylton, June Clyde and Claude Dampier. Hylton played himself in a story built around a millionaire shipowner who hires a band (led by Hylton) to publicise his ships. It was also released as Wherever She Goes.

The film was made at Twickenham Studios. The film's sets were designed by the art director James A. Carter.

For distribution in the United States, to comply with the 1930 Motion Picture Production Code scenes involving portions of two songs and a dance featuring "an undue amount of nudity" were removed.

Partial cast
 Jack Hylton as Himself - Bandleader  
 June Clyde as Dorothy Drew  
 Claude Dampier as Eddie  
 Brian Lawrance as Brian Gates  
 Gwen Farrar as Miss Peachum  
 Marjorie Brooks as Mrs. Marlowe  
 Edmund Breon as Freddie Gates  
 Felix Aylmer as Donald Black

References

Bibliography
 Low, Rachael. Filmmaking in 1930s Britain. George Allen & Unwin, 1985.
 Wood, Linda. British Films, 1927-1939. British Film Institute, 1986.

External links
 

1935 films
1935 musical comedy films
British musical comedy films
1930s English-language films
Films directed by Leslie S. Hiscott
Films shot at Twickenham Film Studios
Films set in England
Seafaring films
British black-and-white films
1930s British films